Bunita Marcus (born May 5, 1952 in Madison, Wisconsin) is an American composer. She began studying composition at the age of sixteen and worked in both electronic and instrumental mediums while at the University of Wisconsin. In 1981, she received a Ph.D. in Composition from the University at Buffalo, The State University of New York where she held the Edgard Varèse Fellowship in Composition and studied with Morton Feldman. Marcus' music has been consistently praised for its beauty and rare sensitivity. Kyle Gann of the Village Voice has called her one of his favorite female composers of all time. He applauds her piano work Julia for its "touching and unassuming depth," which "had the audience hushed under the impact of deeply communicated feeling." Los Angeles critic Alan Rich says her work Adam and Eve "states an eloquent case for the persistence of pure beauty in contemporary composition."

Bunita met Morton Feldman in 1976, beginning a long association that lasted until his death in 1987. For seven years they were inseparable. Feldman and Marcus composed side by side, sharing musical thoughts and ideas. In 1985 Feldman dedicated to her his new piano composition: "For Bunita Marcus." Today, Dr. Marcus lectures, coaches and writes regularly on Morton Feldman's music.

Bunita Marcus has written commissions for Bang on a Can All-Stars (Meet the Composers/Reader's Digest Consortium Commission), the Kronos Quartet, Aki Takahashi, NYSCA & the Gageego Ensemble, Morton Feldman and Soloists, Tokyo's "Sound-Space ARK" ensemble, and others. Her music has received awards from the National Endowment of the Arts (Composer's Fellowship), International Society of Contemporary Music, the League of Composers' National Competition, New York State Council on the Arts and the coveted Kranichsteiner Musikpreis at Darmstadt. From 1985-1990 Dr. Marcus produced the Salon Concert Series with painter Francesco Clemente in New York City. Today she is active as a composer and conductor, appearing in concerts and festivals around the world.

Sources
Oxford Music Online, Steven Johnson, Feldman, Morton

Notes

External links
BunitaMarcus.com
NewMusicBox >> Who is Bunita Marcus?
"Sugar Cubes" CD/DVD
Original Essay on Marcus' Music
Adam and Eve R.A.P.P. Arts Center, New York, NY, May 8, 1989

1952 births
20th-century classical composers
21st-century American composers
21st-century classical composers
American women classical composers
American classical composers
Living people
University at Buffalo alumni
University of Wisconsin–Madison alumni
20th-century American women musicians
20th-century American composers
21st-century American women musicians
20th-century women composers
21st-century women composers